Willem Wijnant (born 16 July 1961) is a Belgian racing cyclist. He rode in the 1988 Tour de France.

References

1961 births
Living people
Belgian male cyclists
Place of birth missing (living people)